The ninety-third Cabinet of Bulgaria took office on May 4, 2017. It was a coalition government that was chaired by Boyko Borisov. The government was formed after the Borisov's party, GERB, won the 2017 parliamentary election. However, GERB won only 95 out of 240 seats in the National Assembly and therefore needed to form a coalition in order to govern.

On 16 April 2021, the 45th National Assembly voted for his resignation with 156 votes in favor, 75 against and 9 abstentions. The government resigned and continued to serve until a new cabinet was appointed.

On 12 May 2021, the Government was dissolved.

Formation
The third Borisov government consisted of ministers from the ruling GERB party and the two leaders of the junior coalition partner United Patriots.

Cabinet
The third Bulgarian Council of Ministers of Bulgaria chaired by Boyko Metodiev Borisov has been voted in by 235 members of the Bulgarian Parliament (of them 134 in favor and 101 against, out of a total of 240 MPs) and sworn into term on May 4, 2017. The government was formed by the GERB Party and the parliamentary coalition of the United Patriots, with the initial support of the newcomer Volya Party of businessman Veselin Mareshki (although one of its MPs voted against). The composition of the Government was as follows:

See also
First Borisov Government
Second Borisov Government
History of Bulgaria since 1989

References

Bulgarian governments
2017 establishments in Bulgaria
2021 disestablishments in Bulgaria
Cabinets established in 2017
Cabinets disestablished in 2021
GERB